In the United States, the National Institutes of Health (NIH) are the primary government agency responsible for biomedical and public health research. They award NIH grants through 24 grant-awarding institutes and centers. 

The NIH supports $31 billion in research annually, given to more than 300,000 researchers at more than 2,500 institutions for research into a variety of conditions. Each institute of the NIH has separate appropriations from Congress determined on an annual basis. Percentages of grant applications funded vary by institute, from 8% (National Institute of Nursing Research) to 29.6% (National Institute of General Medical Sciences), with an overall average of 18%. Funding percentages have dropped from over 30% in the early 2000s, mainly due to an increase in applications, rather than a decrease in funds available. In 1998, 24,100 applications were received, and 7,500 were funded with a total of $1.9 billion. By 2005, the number of applications had grown to 43,000, of which 9,600 were funded with a total of $3.4 billion. In 2015, 52,000 applications were submitted and 9,500 were funded with $4.3 billion. Grants are assessed based on their significance, innovation, and approach.

The major grant awards of the NIH are divided into Research Grants (R series), Career Development Awards (K series), Research Training and Fellowships (T & F series), Program Project/Center Grants (P series), and miscellaneous programs.

There are various requirements for grants. Some grants are specified for "new investigators", which is defined as someone who has not received a prior NIH grant other than a career award or specific small grants (R15, R21, R56, etc.). An "early stage investigator" is someone who has received their PhD or MD or has finished residency within the past 10 years.

Impact on scientific research 
From 2010 to 2016, NIH funded research that led to the development and approval of 210 new drugs. 84 of these were "first-in-class" drugs, meaning they work through previously unknown mechanisms. About 90% of the research published from the funded grants related to the discovery and characterization of these pathways, rather than the development of the drug itself.

A study on the value of public research funding found that 30% of NIH grants led to research being published that was cited in a patent application, and that for every $100 million funded by the NIH, 23 patents were submitted.

Application process 
NIH numbers the types of applications:
 Type 1 – New grant applications
 Type 2 – Competitive renewal of grants currently funded. Applications are essentially the same as for type 1 applications.
 Type 3 – Competitive revision of grants currently funded. Investigators can request additional funding for current grants for additional research or unforeseen costs.
 Type 4 – Extension of grants currently funded
 Type 5 – Noncompetitive continuation of a current grant. Investigators must submit progress reports to receive continued funding.

Applications are reviewed by a Scientific Review Group made up of volunteer subject matter experts, generally professors in the relevant fields, and by a National Advisory Council made up of federal employees. Grants are scored from 1 to 9, with 1 being the highest score. Members of the committees are listed publicly.

Funding process

Funding mechanisms

R01 
The most common research grant mechanism is the R01. It is the oldest funding mechanism of the NIH. R01s are generally awarded for 3–5 years, and are used to support a "discrete, specified, circumscribed research project". R01s can be renewed by competitive application. The application cycle has 3 sets of application dates each year. Standard due dates for new grant applications are February, June, and October 5, and for renewal, resubmission, and revision grant applications are March, July, and November 5. AIDs-related grants have separate due dates. All grant-awarding institutes and centers award R01s. Applications for R01s are complex and are typically over 100 pages by submission.

In financial year 2016, the NIH received 26,187 applications for new R01 grants. 17.3% were funded, for a total of $2.2 billion. The average annual budget was $460,000.

Research project grants 
Other research grant programs include:
 R03, the NIH Small Grant Program, not renewable and limited to 2 years, with a maximum of $50k/year. 
 R13, NIH Support for Conferences and Scientific Meetings
 R15, NIH Academic Research Enhancement Award (AREA), supports small research projects limited to a total of $300k over up to 3 years, at universities in the US that have not received more than $6 million from the NIH per year. 
 R21, NIH Exploratory/Developmental Research Grant Award, limited to 2 years of funding for a total less than $275k, and does not require preliminary data.
 R33, Exploratory/Developmental Grants Phase II, available to R21 awardees
 R34, NIH Clinical Trial Planning Grant Program
 R35, Outstanding Investigator Award
 R37, NIH MERIT award
 R56, NIH High Priority, Short-Term Project Award, "bridge grant", funds applications for R01s that did not receive a qualifying score but are compelling. This award cannot be applied for.
 U01, Research Project Cooperative Agreement
 U10, Cooperative Clinical Research Cooperative Agreements

Program project/center grants 
 P01, Research Program Project Grant
 P20, Exploratory Grants
 P30, Center Core Grants
 P41, Biotechnology Resource Grant
 P50, Specialized Center
 RC2, High Impact Research and Research Infrastructure Programs 
 C06, Research Construction Programs, for the construction or remodeling of research facilities
 DP1, NIH Director's Pioneer Award 
 DP2, NIH Director's New Innovator Awards
 DP5, Early Independence Award

Resource grants 
 R24 Resource-Related Research Projects
 R25 Education Projects
 R50, Research Specialist Award, to support the salaries of non-PI scientists
 X01 Resource Access Program

Training grants 
 T15, Continuing Education Training Program 
 T32, Institutional National Research Service Award 
 T34, Undergraduate NRSA Institutional Research Training Grants
 T35
 T90

Career development awards 
 K01 Research Scientist Career Development Award
 K02 Independent Research Scientist Development Award
 K05 Senior Research Scientist Award
 K07 Academic Career Development Award
 K08 Mentored Clinical Scientist Research Career Development Award
 K12 Clinical Scientist Institutional Career Development Program Award
 K18 Research Career Enhancement Award for Established Investigators
 K22 Career Transition Development Award
 K23 Mentored Patient-Oriented Research Career Development Award
 K24 Midcareer Investigator Award in Patient-Oriented Research
 K25 Mentored Quantitative Research Career Development Award
 K26 Midcareer Investigator Award in Biomedical and Behavioral Research
 K43 Emerging Global Leader Award
 K76 Emerging Leaders Career Development Award
 K99 Pathway to Independence Award, for postdoctoral researchers

References

National Institutes of Health